Tiffany Snow (born December 2, 1981) is an American field hockey player. She competed in the women's tournament at the 2008 Summer Olympics.

College
In 2004, while at Old Dominion, Snow won the Honda Award (now the Honda Sports Award) as the nation's best field hockey player.

References

External links
 

1981 births
Living people
American female field hockey players
Olympic field hockey players of the United States
Field hockey players at the 2008 Summer Olympics
Sportspeople from Escondido, California
21st-century American women
Old Dominion Monarchs field hockey players